Willie Bouyer (born September 24, 1966) is a former American football wide receiver. He played for the Seattle Seahawks in 1989, the Birmingham Fire from 1991 to 1992 and for the Sacramento Gold Miners from 1993 to 1994.

References

1966 births
Living people
American football wide receivers
Michigan State Spartans football players
Seattle Seahawks players
Birmingham Fire players
Sacramento Gold Miners players